And I Love You So is a 2015 Philippine melodrama television series starring Miles Ocampo, Julia Barretto, Dimples Romana and Angel Aquino. The series premiered on ABS-CBN's Kapamilya Gold afternoon block and worldwide on The Filipino Channel from December 7, 2015 to March 11, 2016, replacing Walang Iwanan.

The series is streaming online on YouTube.

Plot
And I Love You So revolves around the lives of Joanna (Miles Ocampo) and Trixie (Julia Barretto), who will find themselves pitted against each other in everything they want. They become bitter rivals in school and even in love when they fall for the same guy – the internet sensation Justin (Iñigo Pascual).

Their rivalry intensifies and becomes more complicated when they are forced to live under one roof as stepsisters. Their lives change when their parents – Joanna's mother Michelle (Dimples Romana), and Trixie's father Alfonso (Tonton Gutierrez) – unexpectedly meet again. After years of being separated from each other, Alfonso takes his chance to ask Michelle, his true love, to marry him amidst the disapproval of Trixie.

But as they start to live their lives anew as one family, Katrina (Angel Aquino), Trixie's mother and Alfonso's first wife, returns after having abandoned both of them years ago without explanation. Now that she's back, Katrina is determined to win back everything Michelle took away from her: her husband, her daughter, and her wealth.

Cast and characters

Main cast
 Miles Ocampo as Joanna R. Valdez - Michelle and Alfonso's daughter, and Trixie's half-sister. The main female protagonist and antihero. She is intelligent, kind, and has determination to fight for what she believes in, including her identity surrounding her father.
 Julia Barretto as Patricia "Trixie" C. Valdez - Katrina and Alfonso's daughter, and Joanna's half-sister. The main antagonist of the series (and later protagonist in the end). Trixie becomes more cunning, deceitful, ruthless and manipulative after her mother makes her believe that Joanna and Michelle are a threat to their family. Later revealed that Dexter is her biological father.
 Dimples Romana as Michelle Ramirez-Valdez - Alfonso's real love interest and later his second wife. She is Joanna's mother and Katrina's ex-best friend. She is the main female anti-hero who seeks vengeance of Alfonso's death.
 Angel Aquino as Katrina Cervantes-Valdez - The first wife of Alfonso and Trixie's mother. She is the ex-best friend of Michelle. She later died with Dexter in a cliff. She is the main female antagonist, and later protagonist in the end.
 Tonton Gutierrez as Alfonso Valdez - The ex-husband of Katrina, current husband of Michelle, and Joanna & Trixie's father. He was later killed by Dexter.
 Jay Manalo as Dominador "Dexter" Eustaquio Jimenez - Katrina's ex-lover and Trixie's biological father. He is the adopted son of Andres Jimenez.

Supporting cast
 Iñigo Pascual as Justin J. Santiago - Trixie's love interest who later has feelings for Joanna.
 Kenzo Gutierrez as Carlo Miranda - Trixie's best friend.
 Benjie Paras as Joey Ramirez - Michelle's brother and Joanna's uncle.
 Dante Rivero as Andres Jimenez - Dexter and Maureen's father.
 Francis Magundayao as Otep Reyes - Joanna's friend.
 Nikki Valdez as Maureen Jimenez-Santiago - Katrina's co-worker, Dexter's sister, and Justin's mother.
 Luke Jickain as Jonvic Santiago - Maureen's husband and Justin's father.
 Neil Coleta as Butch - the coach of volleyball in St. Benedictine College.
 Jong Cuenco as Donnie Miranda  - Carlo's father.
 Chienna Filomeno as Chloe Escudero - Trixie's friend.
 Anna Vicente as Lauren - Trixie's friend.
 Dang Cruz as Yaya Marita - the maid in the Valdez family.
 Cai Cortez as Jinky -  Michelle's friend.
 Miel Abong as Mabel - Joanna's friend.
 Kert Montante as Vic - Joanna's friend.

Special participation
 Sofia Beatrice Pablo as young Trixie
 Myel de Leon as young Joanna
 Peewee O'Hara as Amparo Cervantes
 Alyssa Valdez as Herself

Production

Casting
Raymond Bagatsing and Bing Loyzaga were originally cast for the roles of Alfonso and Maureen, but were later replaced by Tonton Gutierrez and Nikki Valdez.

Scheduling
Initially meant to be part of Primetime Bida evening block, And I Love You So was originally planned to replace Pasión de Amor in early 2016. However, in a last-minute change, the timeslot ended up downgraded as part of Kapamilya Gold afternoon block, after the network decided to immediately end Walang Iwanan on December 4, 2015 due to low ratings and lack of support. The schedule time is after Tubig at Langis.

Soundtrack
The titular theme song And I Love You So performed by Angeline Quinto is part of the volume one of Dreamscape Televisions of Love album.

Episodes

Reception

Ratings

See also
 List of programs broadcast by ABS-CBN
 List of ABS-CBN drama series

References

External links
 

ABS-CBN drama series
Philippine melodrama television series
2015 Philippine television series debuts
2016 Philippine television series endings
Television series by Dreamscape Entertainment Television
Filipino-language television shows
Television shows set in the Philippines